There is only one year-round river in Egypt, the Nile. It has no non-seasonal tributaries for its entire length in Egypt, though it has two further upstream, the Blue Nile and White Nile, which merge in central Sudan.

In the Nile Delta, the river splits into a number of distributaries and lesser channels. In ancient times there were seven distributaries, of which only two are extant today due to silting and flood relief schemes. From east to west, they were:

 the Pelusiac, 
 the Tanitic,
 the Mendesian, 
 the Phatnitic (extant; now the Damietta or Damyat),
 the Sebennytic,
 the Bolbitinic,
 the Canopic (extant; now the Rosetta or Rashid).

The Nile is intersected by a number of normally dry tributaries or wadis which traverse the Eastern Desert. The wadis drain run-off rainfall from the mountains along the Egyptian Red Sea coast, though it only rarely reaches the main trunk of the wadis to flow downstream to the Nile. The three principal wadis are:

 Wadi Abbad (drainage area 7,000 km2)
 Wadi Shait (length 200 km, drainage area 10,000 km2)
 Wadi El-Kharit (length 260 km, drainage area 23,000 km2)

Sinai 
Sinai has a number of wadis, including the Wadi Mukattab ("The Valley of Writing") and the Wadi Feiran (associated with the biblical Rephidim).

Sources 
 The Vegetation of Egypt, pp. 192, 253. M. A. Zahran, A. J. Willis. Springer, 2008. 

 
Egypt
Rivers